Christopher Harris (born 19 October 1985) in Durban, South Africa is a New Zealand rower.

Harris started rowing while at Whanganui High School. He competed at the 2012 Olympics in the men's four, and the boat came fifth in the B final. He won a bronze medal at the 2015 World Rowing Championships. At the 2017 New Zealand rowing nationals at Lake Ruataniwha, he partnered with Robbie Manson in the men's double sculls and they became national champions. Harris announced his retirement from international rowing in September 2021.

References

Living people
1985 births
New Zealand male rowers
Olympic rowers of New Zealand
World Rowing Championships medalists for New Zealand
Rowers at the 2012 Summer Olympics
Rowers at the 2016 Summer Olympics
Rowers at the 2020 Summer Olympics
People educated at Wanganui High School
21st-century New Zealand people